The 1951 Colorado Buffaloes football team was an American football team that represented the University of Colorado as a member of the Big Seven Conference during the 1951 college football season. Led by fourth-year head coach Dallas Ward, the Buffaloes compiled an overall record of 7–3 with a mark of 5–1 in conference play, placing second in the Big 7.

Schedule

References

Colorado
Colorado Buffaloes football seasons
Colorado Buffaloes football